Private law is the area of law concerned with relationships between individual persons (citizens and companies).

Private law may also refer to:

 Private international law, a procedure of resolving conflicts within domestic laws
 Civil law (private law), In England and Wales, law relating to civil wrongs and quasi-contracts
 An Act of Congress in the United States relating to specific institutions or individuals

See also 
 Public law (disambiguation)
 Private law society, a political philosophy which advocates the elimination of the state
 Local and Personal Acts of Parliament in the United Kingdom, private laws in the United Kingdom
 Private bill, a proposal for a private law
 Private member's bill, in some parliaments a bill introduced by a member not on behalf of the executive government